Temperanceville is an unincorporated community in Belmont County, in the U.S. state of Ohio.

History
Temperanceville had its start in 1837 when a gristmill was built there. The proprietor espoused "intense temperance principles", hence the name. A post office called Temperanceville was established in 1848, and remained in operation until 1961.

References

Unincorporated communities in Belmont County, Ohio
1837 establishments in Ohio
Populated places established in 1837
Unincorporated communities in Ohio